Banarsi Prasad Jhunjhunwala was an Indian politician.  He was elected to the Lok Sabha, the lower house of the Parliament of India  as a member of the Indian National Congress. He was also a member of the Constituent Assembly of India.

References

External links
Official biographical sketch in Parliament of India website

1888 births
Year of death missing
Lok Sabha members from Bihar
India MPs 1952–1957
India MPs 1957–1962
Indian National Congress politicians
Members of the Constituent Assembly of India
Indian National Congress politicians from Bihar